The Staircase (also known as Death on the Staircase) is a 2004 French-produced, English-language documentary television miniseries directed by Jean-Xavier de Lestrade about the trial of Michael Peterson, convicted of murdering his wife, Kathleen Peterson.

Following from de Lestrade's Oscar-winning Murder on a Sunday Morning, filming began soon after Peterson's indictment. Camera crews were given access to the accused's extended family, the defense attorneys, and the courtroom.

An abbreviated version was broadcast as a special two-hour presentation of American news show Primetime Thursday on July 22, 2004. The miniseries was completed in September 2004, and premiered in October on Canal+, from January 10–14, 2005, on BBC Four (as part of its Storyville documentary series), and from April 4–25 on Sundance Channel.

Lestrade returned to film Peterson and his family in 2012–2013, covering developments in the case that were released as a two-hour sequel. Three new episodes with further updates were later made for Netflix, and in 2018, the streaming channel added all 13 episodes to its catalog, making it available as one series.

Synopsis
In December 2001, war novelist Michael Peterson called emergency services to report that his wife Kathleen had fallen down a set of stairs in their Forest Hills mansion and died. The authorities disbelieved Peterson's story that Kathleen had fallen while drunk and concluded instead that he had bludgeoned her to death, most likely with a fireplace tool called a blow poke (a gift from Kathleen's sister, which appeared to be missing from the house). Peterson was soon charged with murder. The documentary series detailed the ensuing case from the point of view of Peterson and his legal-defense team, led by attorney David Rudolf.
 
During the trial, it was revealed that while the Petersons were living in Germany, his dear friend (his best friend's widow and the mother of his future adopted daughters) had died ostensibly from an intra-cerebral haemorrhage, followed by the body falling down stairs after collapsing, which resulted in head injuries similar to those sustained by Peterson's second wife. An investigation by German police and  U.S. military authorities concluded that the death was accidental (a subsequent exhumation and autopsy disputed the claim of accidental death). The prosecution introduced this death into the trial as an incident that may have given Peterson the idea of how to fake the true cause of Kathleen's death. During the trial, Peterson's two adopted daughters supported their father's version of the death, while Kathleen's daughter from a first marriage, as well as Kathleen's two sisters, soon grew suspicious, and split from the family.

The prosecution argued that Kathleen discovered Michael's bisexuality and pursuit of sexual liaisons with men, leading to an argument that ended in Michael bludgeoning his wife to death.

Peterson claimed that his wife knew intuitively about his sexuality, frequently teased him indirectly about it, understood that was part of who he was, and would have been fine with his arranging to have sex with anonymous men. He claimed to have been outside, by the pool, when Kathleen fell down the stairs and injured herself. A defense team re-creation claimed that Peterson could not hear his wife's cries for help from such a distance.

The jury ultimately convicted Peterson, and he was sentenced to life in prison. However, the verdict was later overturned in 2011, when the judge ruled that one of the prosecution's main witnesses lied under oath. In 2017, while awaiting his new trial, Michael Peterson entered an Alford plea, in which he accepted a charge of voluntary manslaughter and was sentenced to time served, allowing him to end his time in prison and walk away a free man.

Reception
Reviews of The Staircase are generally positive. It won a Peabody Award in 2005. It also won an IDA award for the Limited Series category in 2005.

Additional Episodes

In April 2012, it was announced that Lestrade was working on a two-hour follow-up film to The Staircase for French broadcaster Canal+, after Michael Peterson was released from jail, pending a retrial. The sequel, subtitled "Last Chance," premiered at the International Documentary Film Festival Amsterdam in November 2012. It aired on Canal+ on January 30, 2013, and on BBC Four's Storyville on February 4. Sundance Channel aired a shorter alternative cut, presenting "Last Chance" as two new episodes of the original miniseries, airing March 4 and March 11, 2013.

On November 23, 2015, Lestrade announced a second follow-up film at the IDFA Forum. Originally announced as Staircase III, the film documents the story of Peterson's final trial, set for early 2016. The film was commissioned by Canal+. Last Chance producer Matthieu Belghiti of What's Up Films was also attached. It was later picked up by Netflix to be released as three new episodes of the miniseries, together with the previous 10 episodes, on June 8, 2018. The first of the new episodes premiered on April 28, 2018, at the Tribeca Film Festival.

All 13 episodes of the series were released on Netflix on June 8, 2018.

Episodes

Legacy 
The first season of the 2017 sitcom Trial & Error parodies this documentary and the details of the case.

A dramatic limited series adaptation of the docuseries, co-produced by Annapurna Television and HBO Max, was announced in March 2021. Titled The Staircase, it premiered on May 5, 2022. It stars Colin Firth as Michael Peterson; Toni Collette as Kathleen Peterson, Michael's wife; Sophie Turner as Margaret Ratliff, one of the Petersons' adopted daughters; Odessa Young as Martha Ratliff, the Petersons' other adopted daughter; Dane DeHaan as Clayton Peterson, Michael's eldest son from his first marriage; Patrick Schwarzenegger as Todd Peterson, Michael's youngest son from his first marriage; Rosemarie DeWitt as Candace Hunt Zamperini, Kathleen's sister; Michael Stuhlbarg as David Rudolf, Michael's lawyer; and Parker Posey as Durham county prosecutor Freda Black. Antonio Campos is credited as series creator and serves as co-showrunner with Maggie Cohn.

References

External links 

2000s French television series
2004 documentary films
2004 French television series debuts
2004 French television series endings
Peabody Award-winning television programs
2000s French television miniseries
Netflix original documentary television series